"The Gift of the Magi" is a short story by O. Henry first published in 1905. The story tells of a young husband and wife and how they deal with the challenge of buying secret Christmas gifts for each other with very little money. As a sentimental story with a moral lesson about gift-giving, it has been popular for adaptation, especially for presentation at Christmas time. The plot and its twist ending are well known; the ending is generally considered an example of comic irony. The story was allegedly written at Pete's Tavern on Irving Place in New York City.

The story was initially published in The New York Sunday World under the title "Gifts of the Magi" on December 10, 1905. It was first published in book form in the O. Henry anthology The Four Million in April 1906.

Plot

On Christmas Eve, Della Young discovers that she has only $1.87 (equivalent to about $62 in 2022) to buy a present for her husband Jim. She visits the nearby shop of a hairdresser, Madame Sofronie, who buys Della's long hair for $20 (about $ in ). Della then uses the money to buy a platinum pocket watch chain for Jim. When Jim comes home from work that evening, Della admits to him that she sold her hair to buy him the chain. Jim gives Della her present – a set of ornamental combs, which she will be unable to use until her hair grows back out. Della gives Jim the watch chain, and he tells her that he sold the watch to buy the combs. While the gifts that Jim and Della gave each other cannot be used, they know how far they went to show each other their love and how invaluable their love truly is. The story ends with the narrator comparing these sacrificial gifts of love with those of the biblical Magi.

Adaptations

Films
 The Sacrifice (1909)
  Love's Surprises Are Futile (1916)
 The Gift of the Magi (1917)
 Ustedes los ricos ("You, the Rich Ones") (1948) includes the tale as a small sub-plot
 As a segment of O. Henry's Full House (1952)
 The Gift of the Magi (1958)
 The Gift of Love (1978)
 Dary magów (Poland, 1972)
 Christmas Eve on Sesame Street (1978)
 I'll not be a gangster, love (/, USSR, 1978),
 Mickey's Once Upon a Christmas (1999)
 The Gift of the Magi (2004)
 Raincoat (2004)
 For the First Time (2010)
 Love, a French movie, based some of its scenes on this story.
 Darovete na vlahvite (2013) directed by Ivan Abadjiev.
 The Gift of the Magi (2014) The Greek film directed by Ismene Daskarolis places it in the economic crisis of contemporary Greece.
 Prem Puran (2019)

Other media
 In 1955, in The Honeymooners episode 13 of season 1, "'Twas the Night Before Christmas" involves Ralph looking for the perfect present for Alice for Christmas. Without money, he pawns his prized bowling ball to buy her an expensive gift, only to find out in the end that she bought him a custom bowling ball bag.
In the 1978 Christmas special Christmas Eve on Sesame Street, Ernie and Bert do an adaptation of "The Gift of the Magi". Ernie gives up his Rubber Duckie to buy Bert a cigar box to put his paperclip collection in, and Bert gives up his paperclip collection to get Ernie a soap dish to put his Rubber Duckie in. In the end, Mr. Hooper happily gives them back their items, realizing how much it hurt to sacrifice their possessions to please each other.
 Emmet Otter's Jug-Band Christmas, which is a twist on "The Gift of the Magi", is a children's storybook by Russell Hoban which was first published in 1971. In 1977, Muppet creator Jim Henson produced a one-hour television adaptation of the story, filmed in Toronto for HBO in the United States and CBC in Canada. The special premiered on HBO on December 17, 1978. The special later aired on ABC in 1980 and on Nickelodeon in the 1990s. The special features several original songs written by songwriter Paul Williams.
 An off-Broadway musical version entitled The Gifts of the Magi premiered at Lamb's Theatre in New York City in 1984. Written by Mark St. Germain and Randy Courts, the play is regularly produced in schools and regional theaters.
 Radio drama series Adventures in Odyssey features a comedic adaptation of this story in its episode "Gifts for Madge & Guy" (1987).
 The opening sketch of the December 10, 1988 episode of Season 14 of Saturday Night Live reimagines "The Gift of the Magi" as Donald and Ivana Trump (played by Phil Hartman and Jan Hooks) selling their yacht Princess and estate Mar-a-Lago, each in order to pay for a gift intended to adorn the other.
 In 1992, in Rugrats episode 27 "The Santa Experience", Phil doesn't know what to get Lil, so Angelica convinces him to give up his precious Reptar doll to get Lil crayons for her coloring book, and then convinces Lil to give up the coloring book to get a space helmet for Phil's Reptar doll even though Angelica was now in possession of it. The twins both believe the sacrifice is the greatest gift of all, leaving Angelica in bitter Christmas spirits until she returns the original gifts.
 In 1993, an episode of Mystery Science Theater 3000 had TV's Frank selling his hair and buying Dr. Forrester a watch fob. However, Dr. Forrester did not sell his watch to buy Frank a comb, merely thanking Frank for the watch fob for his still-owned watch.
In 1998, Indian singer Pankaj Udhas released his album Stolen Moments. The visualization of the song Ahista is a modern adaptation of The Gift of the Magi.
The title of the 1999 Christmas episode of The Simpsons, Grift of the Magi, is a reference to the story.
 A parody appears in the 1999 Futurama episode "Xmas Story", in which Zoidberg gives Amy Wong a set of combs, only for her to reveal that she sold her hair to a wigmaker in order to buy a set of combs for Hermes Conrad, who then reveals that he sold his hair to a wigmaker in order to buy a set of combs for Zoidberg. Zoidberg then reveals that he has purchased Amy and Hermes' hair to wear on his own head.
 In the 1999 Disney Christmas Video Mickey's Once Upon a Christmas Mickey Mouse and Minnie Mouse do an adaptation of The Gift of the Magi.  Mickey trades his harmonica to buy Minnie a chain for her watch and Minnie trades her watch to get Mickey a case for his harmonica.
 The beginning moments of the 2002 special It's a Very Merry Muppet Christmas Movie feature gags based on the story. For example, while Rizzo the Rat sells his collection of rare cheese to buy Gonzo a dish for his mold collection, Gonzo reveals he sold his mold collection to buy Rizzo a cheese slicer.
 In 2004, during the intro of Season 1, Episode 7 of The L Word ("L'Ennui"), Marina Ferrer's lover, Francesca Wolff, synopsizes the story while she seduces the prima ballerina of the opera for which she is the costume designer.
 The 2009 Christmas episode of Robot Chicken features a parody of "The Gift of the Magi", where Jim refuses to sell his watch for expensive brushes and buys Della lingerie instead, much to her displeasure.
 In the 2009 Christmas special of Phineas and Ferb, "Phineas and Ferb Christmas Vacation", Candace sells her necklace that she was planning on trading for earrings, in order to buy her boyfriend Jeremy a new guitar, while Jeremy trades his old guitar which he was planning on trading for a new one, in order to buy Candace the earrings she wanted. This twists the story so that each party ends up with the gift they wanted anyway.
 In 2018, an episode of Puppy Dog Pals entitled "Bingo and Rolly's Birthday" had each of the two dog characters trading their prized possessions (a stick collection and a Captain Dog action figure) to obtain gifts for each other (a box for the stick collection, and a spring to repair the launcher on the action figure).
 A parody appears in the 2019 Family Guy episode "Bri, Robot", in which Peter Griffin gets a job as a masseur, using the money he earns to buy Lois Griffin a comb for her beautiful hair, only for her to reveal that she sold her beautiful hair in order to buy him a bottle of massage oil.
 In Glee season 2, episode 10, Mr. Shue talks about the tale with their students of the choir.
 In 2019 composer Eric Whitacre composed and conducted a one act chamber opera of The Gift of the Magi for five soloists, piano, and the Los Angeles Master Chorale.
 In Fablehaven: Rise of the Evening Star by Brandon Mull, Errol Fisk references the tale while conversing with Kendra about his livelihood.

See also
 List of Christmas-themed literature

References

External links

 "The Gift of the Magi" by O Henry
 
 O'Henry's "The Gift of the Magi":Common Core Exemplar from NEH's EDSITEment
 "The Gift of the Magi" study guide, teacher resources, themes, quotes

1905 short stories
Christmas short stories
American short stories
1900s short stories
Irony
Short stories by O. Henry
Short stories adapted into films
Works originally published in the New York World